The Clay People are an American heavy rock band based in Albany, New York. Singer Daniel Neet has been the only constant member throughout the band's history, providing lyrics and a frontman persona. Guitarist Brian McGarvey and drummer Dan Dinsmore joined in '94 and '96 respectively. These three  formed the core unit that would include an ever-changing lineup of musicians, as its style evolved from American coldwave to post-grunge rock and metal.

Biography
Forming in 1989 as "Clay People", the band debuted with the 1991 EP Toy Box before signing to Re-Constriction Records and issuing their debut album Firetribe in May 1993. Clay People's second EP The Iron Icon and studio album Stone-Ten Stitches followed in 1995 and 1996 respectively. The group added "The" to their name with the release of their 1998 self-titled album, marking a change in direction from their dance club roots to a live rock band with a lineup featuring Neet, Brian McGarvey (guitar), Mike Guzzardi (guitar), D. Patrick Walsh (bass) and Dan Dinsmore (drums). The album was produced by Neil Kernon for Slipdisc Records and was the band's most successful release.  Songs from the record were included in the soundtracks to the films Strangeland, Universal Soldier: The Return, and Marked For Death.

Internal conflicts caused the band to go on hiatus in the early 2000s as members pursued solo and side projects or launched new bands. A new album from The Clay People, Waking the Dead, was released on May 22, 2007 via Overit Records with a lineup featuring only Neet, Dinsmore and McGarvey from the 1996 band. Along with the new release was a music video for the album's first single, "Supersonic Overdrive". Metroland, the local Albany weekly newspaper, featured the band on their front page as "The Return of The Clay People", following the album's release and a successful performance at Edgefest, a local radio station music festival. Shortly following the release of Waking the Dead, the band once again become inactive.

In June 2012, Neet, McGarvey and Dinsmore revived The Clay People to perform at the Cold Waves festival "The Jamie Duffy Memorial Concert" in Chicago in honor of the guitarist from Acumen Nation who killed himself earlier that year. The Clay People began recording again, however, continuing internal conflicts and ongoing problems associated with substance abuse led to more band member lineup changes and an unfinished album as of five years later. The Clay People released a new album, Demon Hero, featuring a revolving door of recording musicians in September 2018. They began to play shows in the northeast and midwest US again citing their "return" as a band, when everything was shutdown in 2020.
New album "Cult Hypnotica" is released July 2022.

Members
Daniel Neet – vocals
Brian McGarvey – guitar
Dan Dinsmore – drums
Jared Weed - guitar
Eric Braymer – bass

Former members
Mike Guzzardi – guitar
Phil Montelone – bass
Eliot Engelman – bass
D. Patrick Walsh – bass
Brendan Slater – bass
Eric Schwanke – bass
John Delehanty – guitar
J. Alexander Eller – keyboards and programming
Peter E. Porto (co-founder) – bass 
Walter Flakus (ex-Stabbing Westward) – guitar, keyboards, backing vocals
Karla Williams – guitar
Duane Beer – guitar
Will Nivens – guitar
Bill Rettie – keyboards
Kevin Bakarian – drums
David Bourgeois – drums
Kevin Micheal Scott – guitar
Jon McClendon – drums
William Ralph – drums

Discography
The Calling b/w Nothing 7" (1990)
Toy Box (1991) Production credit George Hagegeorge
Firetribe (1993) Production credit George Hagegeorge
Cringe (Germany Release) (1995) production credit George Hagegeorge, Van Christie, Jason McNinch
The Iron Icon (1995) production credit Van Christie, Jason McNinch
Strange Day (1996) production credit George Hagegeorge
Stone-Ten Stitches (1997) production credit George Hagegeorge
The Clay People (1998) production credit Neil Kernon
The Headhunter Demos (2001) 
Waking the Dead (2007)
Demon Hero and Other Extraordinary Phantasmagoric Anomalies & Fables (2018)
Cult Hypnotica (2022)

Compilation appearances
Shut Up Kitty: A Cyber-Based Covers Compilation (various artists) (1994) - "Paranoid"
Tribute to Black Sabbath: Eternal Masters (various artists) (1994) - "Paranoid"
Thugs 'N' Kisses (various artists) (1995) - "Pale God (Raw Version)"
Operation Beatbox (various artists) (1996) - "Jump Around"
Strangeland (various artists, film soundtrack) (1998) - "Awake"
Universal Soldier: The Return (various artists, television soundtrack) (1998) - "Awake"
ColdWaves II (various artists) (1997/2013) - "Stone" (Remix by Chris "Boom" Paige)

References

External links

The Clay People at Bandcamp
The Clay People at iTunes

American industrial metal musical groups
Musical groups from New York (state)
American alternative metal musical groups
American musical trios
Re-Constriction Records artists